Empire State Building shooting may refer to:
 1997 Empire State Building shooting
 2012 Empire State Building shooting